The Toronto International Film Festival People's Choice Award is an annual film award, presented by the Toronto International Film Festival to the film rated as the year's most popular film with festival audiences. Past sponsors of the award have included Cadillac and Grolsch.

The winners of this award have often later earned Academy Award nominations, to the point that the award is now considered to be effectively the "starting gun" of the Academy Award nominations race.

In 2009, the festival introduced separate People's Choice Awards for Documentaries and Midnight Madness. In 2015, it also introduced a People's Choice Award for its satellite Canada's Top Ten festival, which was discontinued after 2018 due to TIFF's decision to switch the Canada's Top Ten program from a dedicated festival to a series of week-long theatrical screenings.

Process
At each film screening, attendees are invited to "vote" for the film by rating the film on their ticket stub and depositing it in a box outside the theatre after the show. However, to ensure that the voting process does not bias the award toward films that screened in larger theatres and that a film's own cast and crew cannot stuff the ballot box, the overall number of votes received is also weighted against the size of the screening audience. For example, a film which screened in a smaller theatre, but had a highly passionate fan base, can have an advantage over a film that had a larger number of raw votes but a more mixed or uneven reception. Because each film is screened multiple times over the course of the entire festival, the process also enables the organizers to evaluate which films are generating more audience buzz, by virtue of a significant increase in attendance and/or People's Choice votes at the follow-up screenings.

For the 2020 festival, which was conducted primarily on an online streaming platform due to the COVID-19 pandemic, People's Choice voting was also conducted online; voters' e-mail addresses were cross-referenced against online ticket registrations to ensure that the vote could not be manipulated by people who had not actually seen the films.

After the awards are announced, the festival closes with a free public screening of the winning film at Roy Thomson Hall.

Winners
The table below shows the People's Choice winners of past years. Prior to 2000, only the overall winner was named each year; in that year, the festival began announcing the first and second runners-up for the award as well.

The table notes whether films have been winners or nominees for the Academy Award for Best Picture, Best Foreign Language Film or Best Documentary Feature.

Prior to the creation of the separate People's Choice Award for Documentaries, the main award was won by two documentary films, Best Boy in 1979 and Roger & Me in 1989.

On four occasions to date, the award has been won by a Canadian film. Two of those films, The Decline of the American Empire in 1986 and The Hanging Garden in 1997, were also named as the winners of the juried award for Best Canadian Film, although the 2007 winner Eastern Promises and the 2015 winner Room were not. All four films were also Best Picture nominees at the Genie Awards or the Canadian Screen Awards, which The Decline of the American Empire and Room won.

References

People's Choice
Audience awards